Sentinels of the Multiverse is a cooperative card game published by Greater Than Games and released at Gen Con 2011. Players control a team of comic book-style heroes battling a villain.  Each player controls one or more heroes, while a villain and environment deck each run themselves.  A given game includes 3 to 5 heroes, 1 villain and 1 environment, which can be mixed and matched to create a number of different scenarios.  The core game comes with 10 heroes, 4 villains, and 4 environments.

The board game has also been made into a mobile app game: Sentinels of the Multiverse: The Video Game.

Gameplay
Sentinels of the Multiverse is a cooperative card game for up to five players. The game mechanics of Sentinels of the Multiverse include aspects that are somewhat similar to a variety of other card games, including Magic: The Gathering and Dominion.

The game is played with three different types of decks of cards: Heroes, Villains, and Environment.
 Hero decks include (usually) one card that represents the hero. It gives the hero's initial hit points and a power they may use. If the hero loses all of their hit points, the hero card is flipped over and the hero cannot play any cards or use any powers, but instead has three incapacitated abilities that can be used for the hero to continue to help their allies. Hero decks also contain forty other cards representing ongoing abilities, equipment, and one-shots that can be played. The heroes lose the game when all of them are incapacitated.
 Villain decks also include (usually) one card representing the villain. This card includes their starting hit points, rules for setting up the villain at the start of the game, abilities they take each turn, and a mechanism by which the card may be flipped over. The flipped version of the villain card represents another phase of the fight. Each villain has different flip mechanics. Villain decks also contain twenty-five other cards with one-shots, ongoings, minions, devices, and other types of cards that might be put into play. Villains are generally defeated when reduced to zero or fewer hit points, but may also have other win and/or lose conditions.
 Environment decks represent the environment in which the heroes battle the villain. The environment deck can affect both heroes and villains. Cards in this deck include persistent effects that remain in play until certain conditions are met, one-shots, and neutral targets. Many environment cards can be dismissed if the heroes agree to discard cards or skip turns.

Heroes, Villains, and other targets can all be damaged by damage dealt from any source. Damage has a type, such as melee, projectile, fire, or toxic damage, and certain cards can be used to protect against specific types of damage.

The game is played with three to five heroes, one villain, and one environment. Each villain also has an "advanced" rule that makes them more difficult to fight for an added challenge. Some villain effects are scaled based on 'H', the number of heroes in the game.

Heroes start the game by drawing four cards from their deck into their hand. There is no limit to the number of cards that can be kept in hand. Cards in hand can either be shown or kept hidden. The Villain turn is first, followed by each hero in turn, followed by the environment turn, constituting one round of play. Play continues in turn until the heroes have won or lost. On the villain's turn, any Start of Turn effects are resolved, then a Villain card is played, then any End of Turn effects are resolved. The villain's cards will have specific instructions on where to target damage, such as the hero with the highest hit points. In cases of ties, the players decide as a group where to direct such damage.

On a hero's turn, Start of Turn effects are resolved, then one card may be played, then one power may be used, then one card may be drawn, then End of Turn effects are resolved. If a hero has lost all hit points, then instead Start of Turn effects are resolved, one incapacitated ability may be used, then End of Turn effects are resolved.

Hero and Villain character cards (and in rare cases environment cards) have a nemesis symbol. If a card is dealing damage to another card that has the same nemesis symbol, that damage is increased by one.

On the environment's turn, Start of Turn effects are resolved, one card is played, and the End of Turn effects are resolved.

The core game provides ten hero, four villain and four environment decks. Expansions provide further heroes, villains, and environments, often themed to a setting or concept. These decks can all be played in a mix-and-match style. Two of the expansions, Vengeance and Villains of the Multiverse, provide team villains rather than standard villains. Team villains are used in groups of three to five, matching the number of heroes in the game, and can not be interchanged with standard villains.

Concept and development
Sentinels was conceived by Christopher Badell. He had been playing various comic-book related games, but found that most of them were based on having just two characters directly engaging each other, and wanted instead one "about people with different abilities and different outlooks getting together to beat an overwhelming threat in a weird environment". This led to the basis of Sentinels.

Badell teamed up with artist Adam Rebottaro to craft the first set. Badell worked on creating a fictional comic-book universe inspired by the long histories developed by both DC and Marvel Comics. Badell crafted a timeline of stories that would be published in the fictional "Sentinel Comics" imprint label, enabling him to develop characters and write the flavor text for each card. The initial set featured five heroes inspired by the Avengers, and with characters representing amalgams of established superheroes, such as Legacy blending aspects of both Superman and Captain America. Expansions generally include characters inspired by side plots from the main storyline. Badell also considered the history of comic book publishing when developing characters. One character, Chrono Ranger, a sheriff with time-manipulation powers, was conceived as the result of Sentinel Comics starting out as a cowboy-story publisher and grandfathering this character from their earlier works into superhero settings, akin to Groot's publication history. This also led to variations on heroes reflecting comics' frequent shifting of alliances, with most of the same powers but subtly different effects.

Badell had anticipated that Sentinels would be a limited series based on his narrative approach; he wrote flavor text pointing to an ultimate event to be revealed with the final expansion, "Sentinels of the Multiverse: Oblivaeon". Badell will still continue to support projects based on Sentinels, including a miniature tabletop adaption of the game in Sentinel Tactics, and looks to actually develop comic books based on the Sentinel Comics label.

Reception
Sentinels of the Multiverse has been well received by players and critics since its launch, with Tom Vasel of The Dice Tower podcast giving it the #1 slot in his "top 30 games to look out for from Gen Con 2011", and the review blog Giant Fire Breathing Robot awarding it "Board Game of the Year: 2011".  Reviewers generally praised the art and gameplay, while criticizing the small box, lack of HP trackers, and difficulty scaling among different numbers of players.

Expansions
Greater Than Games released an expansion, Sentinels of the Multiverse: Rook City in the spring of 2012.  The expansion added 2 heroes, 4 villains and 2 environments to the base game.  The villains in Rook City also include an H icon in some cards, which represents the number of heroes in the game, as a way to improve difficulty scaling. The cards used in Rook City are also of a better and thicker cardstock as compared to the original base game.

In the autumn of 2012 Greater Than Games released their second expansion, Sentinels of the Multiverse: Infernal Relics. Similar to Rook City, this expansion added an additional 2 heroes, 4 villains and 2 environments to the game. This expansion also introduced the concept of a super villain group, containing multiple villain characters in a single deck.

As of fall 2013, the Rook City and Infernal Relics expansions are now produced in a combined box.

At the same time as Infernal Relics, Greater Than Games also released a new edition of the base game, Sentinels of the Multiverse: Enhanced Edition. This edition of the game has minor changes to some of the cards and added the H icon to the base game's villains to improve their scalability. A better box with built-in storage inserts was also introduced with this edition, along with dividers for all of the decks available to date. Other improvements include better card stock for all cards and new artwork for the environment cards, in line with what was introduced with Rook City and Infernal Relics. 162 tokens were also included in the new edition to help keep track of damage and the various different types of modifiers.

In spring of 2013, Greater Than Games released the third Expansion, Sentinels of the Multiverse: Shattered Timelines. Similar to Rook City and Infernal Relics, this expansion added 2 heroes, 4 villains, and 2 environments to the game. The Shattered Timelines expansion featured the winning fan-created villain from the Create a Villain Contest run by Greater Than Games in September 2012. The expansion was supported by a Kickstarter campaign that ended successfully on November 29, 2012, having raised $185,200.

During the Shattered Timelines Kickstarter Campaign, Greater Than Games announced that they would use some of the funds raised during that campaign to help finance their fourth expansion Sentinels of the Multiverse: Vengeance. This expansion added 5 heroes, 5 villains, and 2 environments. The new villains have smaller decks than previous villains, as they're designed to be played in a new game mode as a party against the heroes. Vengeance is available as of February 2014. During this time Greater Than Games also released the box set Rook City & Infernal Relics, discontinuing the production of separate boxes for Rook City and Infernal Relics.

The Vengeance box included an advertisement for an upcoming expansion, Wrath of the Cosmos, later released in January 2015. This expansion included 2 heroes, 4 villains and 2 environments. The preorder campaign was largely successful and added 1 more hero, 1 villain, and 1 environment along with 6 hero promos.

The Villains of the Multiverse Expansion, released in December 2015, reintroduces some old villains as well as some new ones, using the Vengeance combat mechanic of having one villain per hero character. This expansion includes ten new villain decks with over-sized villain character cards and four new environment decks. The preorder campaign also allowed the release of 1 promo villain and 1 promo environment, as well as 7 promo hero character cards.

On October 16, 2014, an iOS/Android version was released followed on December 22, 2014 with a Steam release for the PC.

On January 29, 2016, Greater Than Games announced the title of the next expansion, "OblivAeon". They stated that this would be the final expansion for Sentinels of the Multiverse. That Kickstarter ended on March 11, 2016 with 9,982 backers raising $1,518,321. The OblivAeon expansion was released in 2018.

Sentinel Tactics

In March 2014, Greater Than Games announced a Kickstarter for a new game set in the Sentinels of the Multiverse universe, Sentinel Tactics: The Flame Of Freedom. This reached its funding goal in under 6 hours.

Video game adaptation

Handelabra Games adapted the board game into a 2014 video game that was released on iOS and Android devices on October 15, 2014, and for Microsoft Windows, OS X, and Linux computers on December 22. 2014.

The game features both single and multiplayer options as with the board game, and otherwise follows the same rules as the board game, and allowing for the same variation in challenge based on which heroes, villains, and environments were used. The game shipped with a base set of ten heroes, four villains, and four environments, and included additional downloadable content that aligned with the board game's expansions.

Critical reception for Sentinels of the Multiverse has been mostly positive and the game holds a rating of 78/100 on Metacritic, based on 5 reviews. Conor Lorenz of Gizorama gave particular attention to the auto-save function which saves the current battle if the iPad closes down for whatever reason. Andrew Fretz of TouchArcade says that "The app is solidly constructed" but "I don't think there is much meaningful strategy in the game." Brad Cummings of BoardGameGeek gave the app 4/5 stars, concluding "The gameplay that has made this game a cult hit shines bright in this digital version...This is a must have addition to your digital board game collection." He noted that "a lack of information in some parts of the game" may make it hard for new players to keep track of everything happening.

References

External links
https://sentinelsofthemultiverse.com
The Sentinels of the Multiverse wiki

Card games introduced in 2011
Dedicated deck card games
Cooperative board games